Marko Marjanović (born 24 November 1985 in Zemun, SR Serbia, Yugoslavia) is a Serbian rower.

References

1985 births
Living people
Serbian male rowers
Rowers at the 2016 Summer Olympics
Olympic rowers of Serbia
World Rowing Championships medalists for Serbia
Mediterranean Games silver medalists for Serbia
Competitors at the 2013 Mediterranean Games
Mediterranean Games medalists in rowing
European Rowing Championships medalists
21st-century Serbian people